The Sabah State Legislative Assembly (Kadazandusun: Langga' Tinukuan Pogun Sabah) is a part of the legislature of Sabah, Malaysia, the other being the governor of Sabah. The assembly meets at the Sabah State Legislative Assembly Building at Likas in the state capital of Kota Kinabalu.

This unicameral legislature currently has 73 seats representing state constituencies elected through a first-past-the-post electoral system across the state.

Like at the federal level in Malaysia, Sabah uses a Westminster-style parliamentary government, in which members are elected to the legislative assembly through general elections, from which the chief minister and the cabinet are appointed based on majority support. The chief minister is head of government, while the governor acts as head of state. The largest party not forming the government is known as the official opposition, its leader being recognised as leader of the opposition by the speaker.

Members of the assembly refer to themselves as "Members of the Legislative Assembly" (MLAs) and sometimes as "state assemblymen".

The most recent assembly was elected on 26 September 2020. 73 members were elected into the 16th Sabah State Legislative Assembly. As permitted by the State Constitution, the Governor may add six more as nominated MLAs. Gabungan Rakyat Sabah coalition consisting of Perikatan Nasional (PN), Barisan Nasional (BN) and United Sabah Party (PBS) formed the government on 29 September 2020.

Lawmaking 
In accordance with the traditions of the Westminster system, most laws originate with the cabinet (government bills), and are passed by the legislature after stages of debate and decision-making. Ordinary members may introduce privately (private members' bills), play an integral role in scrutinising bills in debate and committee and amending bills presented to the legislature by cabinet.

Officeholders

Chair occupants 
Chair occupants of the assembly are appointed by the governor on the chief minister's advice. Kadzim M. Yahya (BN-UMNO) has been the speaker since 8 October 2020. He is assisted by two Deputy Speakers, Ahmad Abdul Rahman (WARISAN) who was appointed on 7 June 2018 and George Anthony Ginibun (WARISAN) who was appointed on 26 June 2018.

Majority leader 
The majority leader is always the chief minister, who also leads the Cabinet. He is appointed by the Governor on the basis that he is able to command a majority in the assembly. Hajiji Noor (BERSATU), MLA for Sulaman, has been the chief minister since 29 Sep 2020.

Minority leader 
The minority leader is always the leader of the opposition appointed by the largest party not forming the government. Following the defeat of Warisan Plus coalition in the recent state election, Mohd. Shafie Apdal (WARISAN), MLA for Senallang, becomes leader of the Opposition.

Officers

Speaker and Deputy Speaker 
The Governor, on the advice of the Chief Minister, appoints one person from the membership of the Assembly or, in deviation from traditional Westminster practices, from non-members who are qualified to be elected as members of the Assembly, as the presiding officer of the Assembly, known as the Speaker, and another person from the membership of the Assembly to be Deputy Speaker. The lengths of their service are specified by the letters patent that appointed them; however, their term may end premature if they no longer qualify for the membership of the Assembly, they resign, or the Governor terminates their speakership on the advice of the Chief Minister. The Speaker is also disqualified from the chair if they have any personal interest in another organisation; the Deputy Speaker does not need to vacate their office if they have such interests, but is barred from presiding over any matter that affects their interests.

The Speaker or Deputy Speaker presides from a chair at the front of the chamber (opposite the entrance). The Speaker may discipline members who fail to observe the rules of the Assembly. The Speaker or Deputy Speaker remain members of their respective parties while holding the speakership, but they are required by convention to act impartially while presiding over the Assembly. A Speaker or Deputy Speaker who is also an elected member of the Assembly retain voting rights, but by convention does not vote in proceedings they preside over except to break a tie, only doing so according to Speaker Denison's rule.

The following are the Speakers of the Sabah State Legislative Assembly since 1963:

Secretary and Deputy Secretary 
The Secretary and Deputy Secretary of the Legislative Assembly are civil servants that serve as the chief advisers of procedural matters, as well as head the day-to-day administration of the Assembly. They serve a similar role to the Clerk of the House of Commons in the United Kingdom, advising the Speaker on the rules and procedure of the Assembly, signing orders and official communications, and signing and endorsing bills. They are permanent officials and not members of the Assembly. The Governor has the sole power to appoint or remove them.

Other officers 
The  maintains the law, order and security of the Assembly, within the chamber and on the premises of the Assembly building. The Serjeant-at-Arms also carries the ceremonial mace, a symbol of the authority of the Governor and of the Legislative Assembly, into the chamber each day in front of the Speaker, and the mace is laid upon the Table of the Assembly during sittings.

Committees 
The Legislative Assembly uses committees for a variety of purposes, e.g. for the review of bills. Committees consider bills in detail, and may make amendments. This committee sits in the main chamber itself.

Committees can also be created for any purpose – these are known as Select Committees. However, the Select Committees of the Assembly primarily handle administrative matters of the chamber. For example, the Selection and Standing Orders Committee meet to select members of other committees as well as consider changes to the Standing Orders; the Public Petitions Committee handles petitions of any matter from the public; and the Privileges Committee considers questions of parliamentary privilege, as well as matters relating to the conduct of the members. Committees need to be re-established at the beginning of each term.

List of Assemblies

See also 
 Cabinet of Sabah

Notes

References

External links 
 Sabah State Legislative Assembly official website

 
Politics of Sabah
S
Unicameral legislatures